The Third Dynasty of Ur, also called the Neo-Sumerian Empire, refers to a 22nd to 21st century BC (middle chronology) Sumerian ruling dynasty based in the city of Ur and a short-lived territorial-political state which some historians consider to have been a nascent empire.

The Third Dynasty of Ur is commonly abbreviated as Ur III by historians studying the period. It is numbered in reference to previous dynasties, such as the First Dynasty of Ur (26-25th century BC), but it seems the once supposed Second Dynasty of Ur was never recorded.

The Third Dynasty of Ur was the last Sumerian dynasty which came to preeminent power in Mesopotamia. It began after several centuries of control by Akkadian and Gutian kings. It controlled the cities of Isin, Larsa, and Eshnunna and extended as far north as Upper Mesopotamia.

History

The Third Dynasty of Ur arose some time after the fall of the Akkad Dynasty. The period between the last powerful king of the Akkad Dynasty, Shar-Kali-Sharri, and the first king of Ur III, Ur-Nammu, is not well documented, but most Assyriologists posit that there was a brief "dark age", followed by a power struggle among the most powerful city-states. On the king-lists, Shar-Kali-Sharri is followed by two more kings of Akkad and six in Uruk; however, there are no year names surviving for any of these, nor even any artifacts confirming that any of these reigns was historical — save one artifact for Dudu of Akkad (Shar-Kali-Sharri's immediate successor on the list). Akkad's primacy, instead, seems to have been usurped by Gutian invaders from the Zagros Mountains, whose kings ruled in Mesopotamia for an indeterminate period (124 years according to some copies of the king list, only 25 according to others). An illiterate and nomadic people, their rule was not conducive to agriculture, nor record-keeping, and by the time they were expelled, the region was crippled by severe famine and skyrocketing grain prices. Their last king, Tirigan, was driven out by Utu-hengal of Uruk.

Following Utu-Hengal's reign, Ur-Nammu (originally a general) founded the Third Dynasty of Ur, but the precise events surrounding his rise are unclear.  The Sumerian King List states that Utu-hengal had reigned for seven years (or 426, or 26 in other copies), although only one year-name for him is known from records, that of his accession, suggesting a shorter reign.

It is possible that Ur-Nammu was originally his governor. There are two stelae discovered in Ur that include this detail in an inscription about Ur-Nammu's life.

Ur-Nammu rose to prominence as a warrior-king when he crushed the ruler of Lagash in battle, killing the king himself. After this battle, Ur-Nammu seems to have earned the title 'king of Sumer and Akkad.'

Ur's dominance over the Neo-Sumerian Empire was consolidated with the famous Code of Ur-Nammu, probably the first such law-code for Mesopotamia since that of Urukagina of Lagash centuries earlier.

Many significant changes occurred in the empire under Shulgi's reign.  He took steps to centralize and standardize the procedures of the empire.  He is credited with standardizing administrative processes, archival documentation, the tax system, and the national calendar. He captured the city of Susa and the surrounding region, toppling Elamite king Kutik-Inshushinak, while the rest of Elam fell under control of Shimashki dynasty.

The military and conquests of Ur III 

In the last century of the 3rd millennium BCE, it is believed that the kings of Ur waged several conflicts around the frontiers of the kingdom. These conflicts are believed to have been influenced by the king of Akkad. As there is little evidence of how the kings organized their forces, it is unclear whether defensive forces were in the center or outside the kingdom. What is known is that the second ruler of the dynasty, Šulgi achieved some expansion and conquest. These were continued by his three successors but their conquests are less frequent with time.

At the very height of the expansion of Ur, they had taken territory from southeastern Anatolia (modern Turkey) to the Iranian shore of the Persian Gulf, a testimony to the strength of the dynasty. There are hundreds of texts that explain how treasures were seized by the Ur III armies and brought back to the kingdom after many victories. In some texts, it also appears that the Shulgi campaigns were the most profitable for the kingdom, although it is likely that the kings and temples of Ur were primarily those that benefited from the spoils of war.

Conflicts with northeastern mountain tribes
The rulers of Ur III were often in conflict with the highland tribes of the Zagros mountain area who dwelled in the northeastern portion of Mesopotamia. The most important of these tribes were the Simurrum and the Lullubi tribal kingdoms. They were also often in conflict with Elam.

Military rulers of Mari
In the northern area of Mari, Semitic military rulers called the Shakkanakkus apparently continued to rule contemporaneously with the Third Dynasty of Ur, or possibly in the period that just preceded it, with rulers such as military governors like Puzur-Ishtar, who was probably contemporary with Amar-Sin.

Timeline of rulers
Assyriologists employ many complicated methods for establishing the most precise dates possible for this period, but controversy still exists. Generally, scholars use either the conventional (middle, generally preferred) or the low (short) chronologies.  They are as follows:

The list of the Kings of the Third Dynasty of Ur with the length of their reigns, appears on a cuneiform document listing the kings of Ur and Isin, the "List of Reigns of Kings of Ur and Isin" (MS 1686). The list explains: "18 years Ur-Namma [was] king, 48 years Shulgi [was] king, 9 years Amar-Suen, 9 years Su-Suen, 24 years Ibbi-Suen."

Fall of Ur III

The power of the Neo-Sumerians was waning. Ibbi-Sin in the 21st century launched military campaigns into Elam, but did not manage to penetrate far into the country. In 2004/1940 BC (middle/short chronology respectively), the Elamites, allied with the people of Susa and led by Kindattu, king of the Elamite Shimashki dynasty, was able to surround Ur and managed to sack Ur(early summer?) and lead Ibbi-Sin into captivity, ending the third dynasty of Ur. After this victory, the Elamites destroyed the kingdom, and ruled through military occupation for the next 21 years.

Mesopotamia then fell under Amorite influence. The Amorite kings of the Dynasty of Isin formed successor states to Ur III, starting the Isin-Larsa period. They managed to drive the Elamites out of Ur, rebuilt the city, and returned the statue of Nanna that the Elamites had plundered. The Amorites were nomadic tribes from the northern Levant who were Northwest Semitic speakers, unlike the native Akkadians of southern Mesopotamia and Assyria, who spoke East Semitic. By around the 19th century BC, much of southern Mesopotamia was occupied by the Amorites. The Amorites at first did not practice agriculture, preferring a semi-nomadic lifestyle, herding sheep. Over time, Amorite grain merchants rose to prominence and established their own independent dynasties in several south Mesopotamian city-states, most notably Isin, Larsa, Eshnunna, Lagash, and later, founding Babylon as a state.

Dating systems 

When Kings of the Third Ur dynasty ruled they had specific dates and names for each period of their rule. One example was "the year of Ur-nammu king," which marked Ur-Nammu's coronation.  Another important time was the year named "The threshed grain of Largas." This year name references an event in which Ur-Nammu attacked the territory of Largas and took grain back to Ur. Another year-name that has been discovered was the year that Ur-Nammu's daughter became en of the god Nanna and was renamed with the priestess-name of En-Nirgal-ana. This designation as en of Nanna makes the year's designation almost certain.

Social and political organization

Political organization

The land ruled by the Ur III kings was divided into provinces that were each run by a governor (called an ensí). In certain tumultuous regions, military commanders assumed more power in governance.

Each province had a redistribution center where provincial taxes, called bala, would all go to be shipped to the capital. Taxes could be paid in various forms, from crops to livestock to land. The government would then apportion out goods as needed, including funding temples and giving food rations to the needy.

The city of Nippur and its importance 
The city of Nippur was one of the most important cities in the Third Dynasty of Ur. Nippur is believed to be the religious center of Mesopotamia. It was home to the shrine of Enlil, who was the lord of all gods. This was where the God Enlil spoke the king's name and was calling the king to his existence. This was used as a legitimacy for every king in order to secure power. The city is also believed to be a place where people would often take disputes according to some tablets that were found near the city. Politically it is hard to say how significant Nippur was because the city had no status as a dynastic or military power. However, the fact that Nippur never really gave kings any real political or military advantages suggests to some that it was never really conquered. The city itself was more viewed as "national Cult Center." Because it was viewed this way it was thought that any conquest of the city would give the Mesopotamian rulers unacceptable political risks. Also as the city was seen as a holy site this enabled Nippur to survive numerous conflicts that wiped out many other cities in the region.

Social system

This is an area where scholars have many different views.  It had long been posited that the common laborer was nothing more than a serf, but new analysis and documents reveal a possible different picture.  Gangs of labourers can be divided into various groups.

Certain groups indeed seem to work under compulsion.  Others work in order to keep property or get rations from the state.  Still other laborers were free men and women for whom social mobility was a possibility.  Many families travelled together in search of labor.  Such laborers could amass private property and even be promoted to higher positions.  This is quite a different picture of a laborer's life than the previous belief that they were afforded no way to move out of the social group they were born into.

Slaves also made up a crucial group of labor for the state.  One scholar estimates that 2/5 of chattel slaves mentioned in documents were not born slaves but became slaves due to accumulating debt, being sold by family members, or other reasons.  However, one surprising feature of this period is that slaves seem to have been able to accumulate some assets and even property during their lifetimes such that they could buy their freedom.  Extant documents give details about specific deals for slaves' freedoms negotiated with slaveowners.

An early code of law

One salient feature of Ur III is its establishment of one of the earliest known law-codes, the Code of Ur-Nammu.  It is quite similar to the famous Code of Hammurabi, resembling its prologue and bodily structure.  Extant copies, written in Old Babylonian, exist from Nippur, Sippar, and also Ur itself.  Although the prologue credits Ur-Nammu, the author is still somewhat under dispute; some scholars attribute it to his son, Shulgi.

The prologue to the law-code, written in the first person, established the king as the beacon of justice for his land, a role that previous kings normally did not play.  He claims to want justice for all, including traditionally unfortunate groups in the kingdom like the widower or the orphan.

Most legal disputes were dealt with locally by government officials called mayors, although their decision could be appealed and eventually overturned by the provincial governor.  Sometimes legal disputes were publicly aired with witnesses present at a place like the town square or in front of the temple.  However, the image of the king as the supreme judge of the land took hold, and this image appears in many literary works and poems.  Citizens sometimes wrote letters of prayer to the king, either present or past.

Industry and commerce

The Ur III kings oversaw many substantial state-run projects, including intricate irrigation systems and centralization of agriculture.  An enormous labor force was amassed to work in agriculture, particularly in irrigation, harvesting, and sowing.

Textiles were a particularly important industry in Ur during this time.  The textile industry was run by the state.  Many men, women, and children alike were employed to produce wool and linen clothing.  The detailed documents from the administration of this period exhibit a startling amount of centralization; some scholars have gone so far as to say no other period in Mesopotamian history reached the same level.

Trade With the Gulf Region 
Trade was very important to the Ur Dynasty because it was a way to ensure that the empire had enough ways to grow its wealth and care for those Ur ruled. One of the areas that Mesopotamia traded with was the Persian Gulf area. With the Gulf trade some of the most important things that were traded a lot were raw materials like metal, wood, ivory, and also semi-precious stones.  One specific kind of item traded with the two regions were conch shells. These were made by craftsmen who would turn them into lamps and cups dating back to the 3rd millennium. They have been discovered in graves, palaces, temples, and even residential homes. The fact that this item was mostly found in upper class contexts could show that only the wealthy at the time had access to the item. Additionally, Ur consumed jewelry, inlays, carvings, and cylinder seals in significant amounts. The high demand for these items shows a heavy trade relationship with the Gulf region.

Commercial relations with the Indus

Evidence for imports from the Indus to Ur can be found from around 2350 BC. Various objects made with shell species that are characteristic of the Indus coast, particularly Trubinella Pyrum and Fasciolaria Trapezium, have been found in the archaeological sites of Mesopotamia dating from around 2500-2000 BC. Several Indus seals with Harappan script have also been found in Mesopotamia, particularly in Ur and Babylon. About twenty seals have been found from the Akkadian and Ur III sites, that have connections with Harappa and often use the Indus script.

These exchanges came to a halt with the decline of the Indus valley civilization after around 1900 BC.

Art and culture 

Sumerian dominated the cultural sphere and was the language of legal, administrative, and economic documents, while signs of the spread of Akkadian could be seen elsewhere.  New towns that arose in this period were virtually all given Akkadian names. Culture also thrived through many different types of art forms.

Literature
Sumerian texts were mass-produced in the Ur III period; however, the word 'revival' or 'renaissance' to describe this period is misleading because archaeological evidence does not offer evidence of a previous period of decline.  Instead, Sumerian began to take on a different form.  As the Semitic Akkadian language became the common spoken language, Sumerian continued to dominate literature and also administrative documents. Government officials learned to write at special schools that used only Sumerian literature.

Some scholars believe that the Uruk Epic of Gilgamesh was written down during this period into its classic Sumerian form.  The Ur III Dynasty attempted to establish ties to the early kings of Uruk by claiming to be their familial relations.

For example, the Ur III kings often claimed Gilgamesh's divine parents, Ninsun and Lugalbanda, as their own, probably to evoke a comparison to the epic hero.

Another text from this period, known as "The Death of Urnammu", contains an underworld scene in which Ur-Nammu showers "his brother Gilgamesh" with gifts.

See also 
List of Mesopotamian dynasties
Renaissance of Sumer

References

Further reading
Jacob L. Dahl, "The ruling family of Ur III Umma. A Prosopographical Analysis of an Elite Family in Southern Iraq 4000 Years ago", Nederlands Instituut Voor Het Nabije Oosten, 2007

External links
The State of Ur III Research

 
States and territories established in the 3rd millennium BC
States and territories disestablished in the 3rd millennium BC
States and territories disestablished in the 20th century BC
Sumer
Ur
Levant
Middle Eastern royal families
22nd-century BC establishments
Former empires in Asia
Former monarchies